The administrative divisions of Nepal are subnational administrative units of Nepal. The first level of country subdivision of Nepal are the provinces. Each province is further subdivided into districts, each district into municipalities and rural municipalities, and each of those municipalities into wards. Before 2015, instead of provinces, Nepal was divided into developmental regions and administrative zones.

Fulfilling the requirement of the new constitution of Nepal in 2015, all old municipalities and villages (which were more than 3900 in number) were restructured into 753 new municipalities and rural municipalities. The former 75 district development committees (DDC) were also replaced by 77 new district coordination committees (DCC) which have much less power than the DDCs. At present there are 6 metropolitan cities, 11 sub-metropolitan cities, 276 municipalities, and 460 rural municipalities.

Provinces 

Nepal is composed of seven provinces. They are defined by schedule 4 of the new constitution, by grouping together the existing districts. Two districts however are split in two parts, ending up in two different provinces.

Districts 

Provinces are further divided into districts, of which there are 77 (as of 2017). Each of the districts is governed by a District Coordination Committee.

Municipalities of Nepal

Urban Municipalities 

Municipalities are places having at least some minimum criteria of population and infrastructure and declared as a municipality by the government. There are 293 municipalities in Nepal. 

Urban municipalities are categorized into 3 levels:
Metropolitan city (Mahanagarpalika)
Sub metropolitan city (Upmahanagarpalika)
Municipality (Nagarpalikas)

There are six metropolitan cities; the capital city Kathmandu, as well as Bharatpur, Biratnagar, Pokhara, Lalitpur and Birgunj. There are 11 sub-metropolitan cities and 276 municipalities.

Rural Municipalities 

Rural municipalities (Gaunpalikas) were established in 2017, replacing the village development committees (VDCs). The main purpose of a gaunpalika resembles that of a VDC, but it has more rights on collection of royalty and taxes and has a higher annual budget than the VDC. Several VDCs were usually combined into each new gaupalika. There are 460 gaunpalikas in Nepal.

See also
Local self-government in Nepal
 List of mayors of municipalities in Nepal
 List of chairpersons of rural municipalities in Nepal

Notes

References

Geography of Nepal